Thomas Donald Meek (14 July 1878 – 18 November 1946) was a Scottish-American actor. He first performed publicly at the age of eight and began appearing on Broadway in 1903.

Meek is perhaps best known for his roles in the films You Can't Take It with You (1938) and Stagecoach (1939). He posthumously received a star on the Hollywood Walk of Fame in 1960.

Early years 
Meek was born in Glasgow to Matthew and Annie Meek. In the 1890s, the Meek family emigrated to Canada and then to the United States. By 1900, they were living in Philadelphia where Meek was employed as a dry goods salesman, according to the United States census of that year with Meek later working on stage.

Career 

Meek's Broadway credits include The Minister's Daughters (1903), Going Up (1917), Nothing But Love (1919), The Hottentot (1920), Little Old New York (1920), Six-Cylinder Love (1921), Tweedles (1923), The Potters (1923), Easy Terms (1925), Fool's Bells (1925), Love 'em and Leave 'em (1926), The Shelf (1926), Spread Eagle (1927), My Princess (1927), The Ivory Door (1927), Mr. Moneypenny (1928), and Jonesy (1929). In Broken Dishes (1929), he starred with a young Bette Davis.

After years on the stage, Meek became a film actor, appearing memorably in several movies including The Adventures of Tom Sawyer, Little Miss Broadway, and State Fair. Before becoming an actor, he fought in the Spanish–American War in the United States Army and contracted yellow fever which caused him to lose his hair. He was cast as timid, worried characters in many of his films, and is perhaps best known for his roles as Mr. Poppins in Frank Capra's You Can't Take It With You and as whiskey salesman Samuel Peacock in John Ford's Stagecoach.

From 1931 through 1932, Meek was featured as criminologist Dr. Crabtree in a series of 12 Warner Bros. two-reel short subjects written by S.S. Van Dine.

Personal life 
Meek and Isabella "Belle" Walken married in Boston in a Methodist church on January 3, 1909. By this marriage, the American-born Belle Meek lost her United States citizenship by taking her husband's British nationality.

Death
Donald Meek died of leukaemia on 18 November 1946 in Los Angeles, while filming the role of Mr. Twiddle in  Magic Town. A prolific film actor in over 100 Hollywood movies during its Golden Age, he received a posthumous star on the Hollywood Walk of Fame. He was entombed in the Fairmount Mausoleum at Fairmount Cemetery in Denver, Colorado.

Selected filmography

Six Cylinder Love (1923) as Richard Burton
The Hole in the Wall (1929) as Goofy
The Love Kiss (1930) as William
The Girl Habit (1931) as Jonesy
Personal Maid (1931) as Pa Ryan
Wayward (1932) as Hotel Clerk (uncredited)
Love, Honor, and Oh Baby! (1933) as Luther Bowen
Ever in My Heart (1933) as Storekeeper (scenes deleted)
College Coach (1933) as Prof. Spencer Trask
Hi Nellie! (1934) as Durkin
Bedside (1934) as Dr. George Wiley
The Last Gentleman (1934) as Judd Barr
Murder at the Vanities (1934) as Dr. Saunders
The Defense Rests (1934) as Fogg
The Merry Widow (1934) as Valet
Mrs. Wiggs of the Cabbage Patch (1934) as Mr. Wiggs
What Every Woman Knows (1934) as Snibby - Jeweler (uncredited)
The Captain Hates the Sea (1934) as Josephus Bushmills
It's a Gift (1934) as Uncle Bean in Photograph (uncredited)
The Mighty Barnum (1934) as Minor Role (scenes deleted)
Biography of a Bachelor Girl (1935) as Mr. Irish, Moose Village General Store
Romance in Manhattan (1935) as Minister
The Gilded Lily (1935) as Hankerson
Society Doctor (1935) as Moxley
The Whole Town's Talking (1935) as Hoyt
Baby Face Harrington (1935) as Skinner
Mark of the Vampire (1935) as Dr. Doskil
The Informer (1935) as Peter Mulligan
Village Tale (1935) as Charlie
Old Man Rhythm (1935) as Paul Parker
China Seas (1935) as Passenger Playing Chess (uncredited)
Accent on Youth (1935) as Orville (uncredited)
Happiness C.O.D. (1935) as Thomas Sherridan
The Return of Peter Grimm (1935) as Mayor Everett Bartholomew
She Couldn't Take It (1935) as Uncle Wyndersham
Barbary Coast (1935) as Sawbuck McTavish
Peter Ibbetson (1935) as Mr. Slade
Kind Lady (1935) as Mr. Foster
Captain Blood (1935) as Dr. Whacker
The Bride Comes Home (1935) as The Judge
Everybody's Old Man (1936) as Finney
And So They Were Married (1936) as Hotel Manager
One Rainy Afternoon (1936) as Judge
Three Wise Guys (1936) as Gribbie
Three Married Men (1936) as Mr. Frisbee
Old Hutch (1936) as Mr. Gunnison
Two in a Crowd (1936) as Bennett
Love on the Run (1936) as Caretaker
Pennies from Heaven (1936) as Gramp Smith
Maid of Salem (1937) as Ezra Cheeves
Behind the Headlines (1937) as Potter
Parnell (1937) as Murphy
Three Legionnaires (1937) as Uriah S. Grant
The Toast of New York (1937) as Daniel Drew
Artists and Models (1937) as Dr. Zimmer
Make a Wish (1937) as Joseph
Double Wedding (1937) as Judge Blynn (uncredited)
Breakfast for Two (1937) as Justice of the Peace
You're a Sweetheart (1937) as Conway Jeeters
Double Danger (1938) as Gordon Ainsley aka Henry Robinson
The Adventures of Tom Sawyer (1938) as Sunday School Superintendent
Goodbye Broadway (1938) as Iradius P. Oglethorpe
Having Wonderful Time (1938) as P.U. Rogers
Little Miss Broadway (1938) as Willoughby Wendling
You Can't Take It with You (1938) as Poppins
Hold That Co-ed (1938) as Dean Fletcher
Jesse James (1939) as Mc Coy
Stagecoach (1939) as Samuel Peacock
Young Mr. Lincoln (1939) as Prosecutor John Felder
Blondie Takes a Vacation (1939) as Jonathan N. Gillis
Hollywood Cavalcade (1939) as Lyle P. Stout
The Housekeeper's Daughter (1939) as Editor Wilson
Nick Carter, Master Detective (1939) as Bartholomew
Oh, Johnny, How You Can Love (1940) as Adelbert Thistlebottom
Dr. Ehrlich's Magic Bullet (1940) as Mittelmeyer
My Little Chickadee (1940) as Amos Budge
The Man from Dakota (1940) as Mr. Vestry
The Ghost Comes Home (1940) as Mortimer Hopkins, Sr.
Star Dust (1940) as Sam Wellman
Turnabout (1940) as Henry
Phantom Raiders (1940) as Bartholomew
The Return of Frank James (1940) as McCoy
Sky Murder (1940) as Bartholomew
Third Finger, Left Hand (1940) as Mr. Flandrin
Hullabaloo (1940) as Mr. Clyde Perkins
Design for Scandal (1941)
The Wild Man of Borneo (1941) as Professor Birdo
Come Live with Me (1941) as Joe Darsie
Blonde Inspiration (1941) as 'Dusty' King
Free and Easy (1941) as Tout (uncredited)
Barnacle Bill (1941) as 'Pop' Cavendish
A Woman's Face (1941) as Herman Rundvik
The Feminine Touch (1941) as Captain Makepeace Liveright
Rise and Shine (1941) as Professor Philip Murray
Babes on Broadway (1941) as Mr. Stone
Tortilla Flat (1942) as Paul D. Cummings
Maisie Gets Her Man (1942) as Mr. Stickwell
The Omaha Trail (1942) as Engineer Jonah McCleod
Seven Sweethearts (1942) as Reverend Howgan, the Minister
Keeper of the Flame (1943) as Mr. Arbuthnot
They Got Me Covered (1943) as Little Old Man
Air Raid Wardens (1943) as Eustace Middling
Du Barry Was a Lady (1943) as Mr. Jones / Duc de Choiseul
Lost Angel (1943) as Professor Catty
Rationing (1944) as Wilfred Ball
Two Girls and a Sailor (1944) as Mr. Nizby
Bathing Beauty (1944) as Chester Klazenfrantz
Maisie Goes to Reno (1944) as Parsons
Barbary Coast Gent (1944) as Bradford Bellamy I
The Thin Man Goes Home (1945) as Willie Crump
State Fair (1945) as Hippenstahl
Because of Him (1946) as Martin
Colonel Effingham's Raid (1946) as Doc Buden
Janie Gets Married (1946) as Harley P. Stowers
Affairs of Geraldine (1946) as Casper Millhouse
The Hal Roach Comedy Carnival (1947) as Henry Cadwallader, in 'Fabulous Joe'
The Fabulous Joe (1947) as Henry Cadwallader, Lawyer
Magic Town (1947) as Mr. Twiddle (final film role)

References

External links

Portraits of Donald Meek from Stagecoach by Ned Scott

1878 births
1946 deaths
Scottish male stage actors
20th-century Scottish male actors
Scottish male film actors
Deaths from leukemia
Deaths from cancer in California
Scottish emigrants to the United States